Jimmy Archey (12 October 1902 – 16 November 1967) was an American jazz trombonist born in Norfolk, Virginia, perhaps most noteworthy for his work in several prominent jazz orchestras and big bands of his time (including his own). He performed and recorded with the James P. Johnson orchestra, King Oliver, Fats Waller and the Luis Russell orchestra, among others.

In the late 1930s, Archey participated in big bands that simultaneously featured musicians such as Benny Carter, Coleman Hawkins, Cab Calloway, Duke Ellington and Claude Hopkins. In the 1940s and 1950s, Archey spent much of his time working with New Orleans revivalist bands with artists such as Bob Wilber and Earl Hines.

References

Dixieland trombonists
Swing trombonists
American jazz trombonists
Male trombonists
1902 births
1967 deaths
20th-century American musicians
20th-century trombonists
Jazz musicians from Virginia
20th-century American male musicians
American male jazz musicians
Jazzology Records artists